Strauss Waltzes is an album of music composed by Richard Strauss and performed by Mantovani and His Orchestra. It was released in 1958 by London (catalog no. PS 118). It debuted on Billboard magazine's pop album chart on November 24, 1958, peaked at the No. 7 spot, and remained on the chart for 24 weeks. It was an RIAA certified gold album (minimum 500,000 units sold).

Track listing
Side 1
 "Blue Danube"
 "Voices of Spring"
 "Roses from the South"
 "Emperor Waltz"
 "A Thousand and One Nights"
 "Treasure Waltz"

Side 2
 "Village Swallows"
 "Wine, Women and Song"
 "Acceleration Waltz"
 "Tales from the Vienna Woods"
 "Morning Papers (Morgenblätter)"
 "You and You (Du und Du)"

References

1958 albums
London Records albums
Mantovani albums